The Free Arabian Legion was the collective name of several Nazi German units formed from Arab volunteers from the Middle East, notably Iraq, and North Africa during World War II.

Operational history

Origins
At the beginning of April 1941, Iraqi politician Rashid Ali al-Gaylani, along with several more Iraqi officers who were part of the nationalist group Golden Square, overthrew the pro-British regime in the Kingdom of Iraq. The new pro-Nazi government sought German and Italian support for an Iraqi revolt against British forces in the country. Contact was established with the Axis powers with the help of the Grand Mufti of Jerusalem Amin al-Husseini, a Nazi supporter who had been living in Iraq since he had fled imprisonment from Mandatory Palestine shortly before the war.

In May 1941, the Anglo-Iraqi War began with British forces entering Iraq. Adolf Hitler had agreed to send Luftwaffe squadrons to support Iraq as well as Sonderstab F, a special mission headed by Hellmuth Felmy which was to support the revolt and raise a German-led Arab brigade.

By the end of May, the Iraqi forces had been beaten by the British, and al-Husseini and al-Gaylani fled to Iran and then Germany. After the defeat, a number of Arab sympathisers were shipped out of the Middle East through French Syria and ended up in Cape Sounion, Greece.

Units
Hellmuth Felmy had by June been given command of Army Group Southern Greece and was to continue the raising of the German-Arab units through Sonderstab F, which had now been expanded and "should be the central field office for all issues of the Arab world which affect the Wehrmacht". Sonderverband 288 contained only a small proportion of Arab soldiers. However, the term Free Arabian Legion was not the name of any specific unit, but an all-encompassing name for all Arabic units in the German Army.

Sonderverband 287
 was formed on 4 August 1942, with much help from Amin al-Husseini and Rashid Ali al-Gaylani and consisted of mostly of Iraqi and Syrian Muslims, bolstered by former prisoners of war and other volunteers.

The 3rd battalion of Sonderverband 287 was taken from the unit and sent as the Deutsche-Arabische Lehr-Abteilung to the Caucasus in September 1942. It was part of the Axis offensive into the region and the German plan to seat the Iraqi government-in-exile there. It was then to use the region as a springboard for conquering Iraq. The plan never came to be and the unit never saw action following heavy German setbacks in late 1942. The unit was sent to the battle in Tunisia via Italy in January 1943. There, the Deutsche-Arabische Lehr-Abteilung was placed on the southern flank of the Axis army and was used to recruit more local Arabs who formed a second battalion of auxiliaries, who were used for guard duty and as construction troops. The whole unit was captured along with the rest of all Axis forces in Africa in May 1943.

The remaining soldiers of the 3rd battalion, i.e. the Deutsche-Arabische Lehr-Abteilung, who had not been sent to North Africa, were used, together with Muslims from French North Africa, to form the German-Arab Battalion 845 in the summer of 1943. It served in the Peloponnese region of Greece as part of the 41st Fortress Division from November 1943. It participated in the Greek partisan war, particularly against ELAS. In October 1944, it was withdrawn from Greece to Yugoslavia, and in early 1945 was strengthened with the addition of Arabs from a battalion of Arab volunteers that was disbanded before it was fully formed. It ended the war near Zagreb as part of the 104th Jäger Division.

The 1st and 2nd battalions of the Free Arabian Legion who had not been part of the Deutsche-Arabische Lehr-Abteilung were used to replace losses and rebuild Grenadier Regiment 92 together with a light battery and light pioneer company on 2 May 1943, which was then renamed Grenadier Regiment 92 (MOT) on 5 June 1944. The regiment moved to Yugoslavia to fight against Partisans and was part of Army Group F. The regiment suffered heavy losses in the fighting near Belgrade in October 1944, and what remained of it became part of the 2nd Panzer Army, where it was rebuilt into Panzergrenadier Brigade 92 in January 1945. The whole army capitulated in disarray in Austria in May 1945.

Sonderverband 288
 consisted mostly of Germans, but with a cadre of Arab translators and a mobile printing company that could produce Arabic-language leaflets as well as a squad for the operation of oil production facilities. By January 1942, the whole unit was transferred to Libya to defend against British forces in the North Africa Campaign. The unit was planned to eventually be used in an invasion of the Middle East via Egypt, but this never came to be. After several months of fighting, the unit was renamed Panzer Grenadier Regiment Africa, and was eventually captured by American forces following the capitulation of all Axis forces in North Africa in May 1943.

See also
 Azerbaijani Legion
 Free Indian Legion
 Relations between Nazi Germany and the Arab world
 Waffen-SS foreign volunteers and conscripts and related articles, especially under
Amin al-Husseini#Recruitment
13th Waffen Mountain Division of the SS Handschar (1st Croatian)
23rd Waffen Mountain Division of the SS Kama (2nd Croatian)

References

Further reading

External link

Foreign volunteer units of the Wehrmacht
Military units and formations established in 1941
Military units and formations disestablished in 1945
Military history of Iraq
Military history of Syria
Arab collaborators with Nazi Germany